Brewster is a ghost town in southwest Polk County, Florida, United States, ten miles south of Mulberry. It is at an elevation of 143 feet above sea level and has been uninhabited since the early 1960s. The population is 3, according to the 2010 Census.

The village of Brewster was founded in 1910 and for decades flourished from phosphate mining. It was largely a company town for American Cyanamid. The town had its own schools, movie theater, medical clinic, post office, which was established in 1913 and discontinued in 1961, and swimming pool.

The inventor of the digital computer, John Vincent Atanasoff, though born in Hamilton, New York, grew up in Brewster.

The village was officially closed down by the company in 1962. Much of Brewster was demolished at the time, but some abandoned buildings remain, including a smokestack which rises prominently in the area as a landmark. The deed to Brewster was turned over to the state of Florida in partial payment of a judgment against American Cyanamid for environmental damages.

Gallery

See also
Agrock yard, a nearby railroad yard

References

External links 
 Brewster Pages
 Brewster on GhostTowns.com

Ghost towns in Florida
Company towns in Florida
Former populated places in Polk County, Florida
Populated places established in 1910
Census-designated places in Florida
1910 establishments in Florida